Valdomiro Soares Eggres (born 8 February 1988), simply known as Valdo, is a Brazilian professional footballer who plays for Trat in Thai League 2 as a forward.

After playing for a host of clubs in Brazil, on 27 June 2014 he signed for Cypriot club Ethnikos Achna.

Honour
Nongbua Pitchaya
 Thai League 2 Champions : 2020–21

References

External links
 

1988 births
Living people
Brazilian footballers
Association football forwards
Brusque Futebol Clube players
Criciúma Esporte Clube players
Boa Esporte Clube players
Campinense Clube players
Brasília Futebol Clube players
Ituano FC players
Ethnikos Achna FC players
Valdomiro Soares Eggres
Valdomiro Soares Eggres
Campeonato Brasileiro Série B players
Brazilian expatriate footballers
Cypriot First Division players
Expatriate footballers in Cyprus
Brazilian expatriate sportspeople in Cyprus
Valdomiro Soares Eggres
Brazilian expatriate sportspeople in Thailand
Expatriate footballers in Thailand